The NEC PC-6000 series is a series of 8-bit home computers introduced in November 1981 by NEC Home Electronics. There are several models in this series, such as the PC-6001, the PC-6001 MK2 and the PC-6001 MK2 SR. There is also an American version, called the NEC TREK, or NEC PC-6001A. It was followed by the PC-6600 series.

Several peripherals were available for the system in North America, including an expander with three cartridge jacks (some of the cartridge-based games used two cartridges), a cassette-tape recorder, a 5.25" floppy disk drive, a printer, and a touchpad.

Development 
 was a subsidiary of NEC and a manufacturer of consumer electronics. They started manufacturing the PC-8001 and its peripherals which were developed by the Electronic Devices Group of Nippon Electric. It was successful and grew the personal computer market in Japan. They started developing a low-cost home computer, and it became the PC-6001. At the same time, the Electronic Devices Group developed the PC-8801 for home and business, and the Information Processing Group developed the PC-9801 for business market. In 1983, New Nippon Electric changed its name to NEC Home Electronics. At that time, NEC group had four personal computer lines come out from different divisions. To avoid conflict, they decided to consolidate personal computer business into two divisions; NEC Home Electronics dealt with the 8-bit home computer line, and the Information Processing Group dealt with the 16-bit personal computer line. NEC Home Electronics discontinued development of the PC-6000 series, the PC-6600 series, and the PC-8000 series. These lines were merged to the PC-8800 series.

PC-6001 

The PC-6001 has the µPD780 processor (NEC clone of Zilog Z80), 16 KB RAM (up to 32 KB), General Instrument AY-3-8910 3-voice sound generator, a ROM Cartridge connector, a cassette tape interface, 2 x joystick port, a parallel printer connector, an RF modulator output and a composite video output. It supports four screen modes; 32x16 characters with 4 colors, 64x48 pixel graphics with 9 colors, 128x192 graphics with 4 colors, and 256x192 graphics with white and green colors. The ROM cartridge allowed the user to easily use software such as video games. The Japanese version uses a chiclet keyboard while a North American version (PC-6001A) uses a typewriter keyboard.

PC-6001mkII 

The PC-6001mkII has 64 KB memory, 16 KB video RAM, a 5¼-inch 2D floppy drive interface, Kanji character generator, RGB monitor out, speech synthesizer unit and a typewriter keyboard. It supports following screen modes: 40x20 characters, 80x80 pixel graphics with 15 colors, 160x200 graphics with 15 colors, and 320x200 graphics with 4 colors.

References 

Notes
NEC PC 6001, OLD-COMPUTERS.COM: The Museum
NEC PC 6001 MK 2, OLD-COMPUTERS.COM: The Museum
NEC PC 6001 MK 2 SR, OLD-COMPUTERS.COM: The Museum

Pc-6001
Z80-based home computers